My Brother and Me is an American sitcom, created by Ilunga Adell and Calvin Brown Jr., that originally aired on Nickelodeon. My Brother and Me is about the Parkers, a family living in the west side of Charlotte, North Carolina, who experience the highs and lows of everyday life.

It premiered on October 15, 1994, and ended on January 15, 1995, with a total of 13 episodes over the course of one season. In June 2014, Nickelodeon released My Brother & Me: The Complete Series as a two-disc manufacture on demand (MOD) release through Amazon in region 1.

Production on the series wrapped in August 1994.

Plot
The show centers on the Parkers, a family living in the west side of Charlotte, North Carolina, who experience the highs and lows of everyday life. The series starred Arthur Reggie III as pre-teen son Alfie, Ralph Woolfolk IV as his younger brother Dee-Dee, Aisling Sistrunk as older sister Melanie, Karen E. Fraction as mother Jennifer Parker, Jim R. Coleman as father Roger Parker, and Jimmy Lee Newman, Jr. as Alfie's troublesome best friend, Milton "Goo" Berry.

Cast

Main 
 Arthur Reggie III plays as Alfred "Alfie" Parker: He is Dee-Dee's older brother and a younger brother to Melanie. He is friends with Goo. He is 11 years old, but turns 12 in "The Surprise".

 Ralph Woolfolk IV plays as Derek "Dee-Dee" Parker: He is Alfie and Melanie's youngest brother. Best friends with Donnell and Harry. He is 8 years old.

 Jimmy Lee Newman, Jr. plays as Milton "Goo" Berry: Alfie's best friend who is in love with Melanie. He is 11 years old.

 Aisling Sistrunk plays as Melanie Parker: She is Alfie and Dee-Dee's older sister. She is best friends with Dionne. She is 15 years old.

 Karen E. Fraction plays as Jennifer Parker: The kids' mother who often falls for Goo's sweet talk. She has an older sister, Helen. She is 36 years old.

Jim R. Coleman as Roger Parker: The kids' father. He is 33 years old.

Recurring 
 Stefan J. Wernli as Donnell Wilburn: Dee-Dee's best friend besides Harry and Deonne's little brother. He is 8 years old. He turns 9 in "Dance".
Amanda Seales as Deonne Wilburn: Melanie's fast talking best friend and Donnell's older sister. She is 13 years old. Dionne has a habit of being pessimistic and comes up with negative scenarios which sometimes involves her crush named Tim that even annoy Melanie. She is also antagonistic towards Goo whenever he insults her.
 Christopher Guerriero as Milton Garcia
 Keith "Bubba" Naylor as Harry White: Dee-Dee's best friend besides Donnell. He is 8 years old.
 Renaldo Ferguson as himself
Kym Whitley as Mrs. Pickney: The owner of the comic book store. She's sometimes bossy towards Dee Dee, Donnell, and Harry by kicking them out of her store if they did something wrong or don't have any money to pay. Pickney was also supportive of Dee-Dee when he suggested that Kendall Gill attend the charity carnival. She's 33 years old.
 Willie Brunson as Moo Berry: Goo's cousin, a classmate of Dee-Dee's. Although like Goo in being his sweet talk, he also enjoys seeing Goo in trouble with his friend, Alfie.
 Florence Anthony as Aunt Helen: Jennifer's sister, Roger's sister-in-law and the children's aunt.
Vanessa Baden as Janie, age 8. Dee-Dee's classmate who is a tomboy and likes baseball cards.
Kendall Gill as himself, age 26
 Mekia Cox
 Anais Adell
Kenny Layne, age 13
 Misty Lee Gentle
 Micah Cox
 Patricia Kizzie 
 Art Dohany 
 Avis Marie Barnes as Mrs. Wilburn: Dionne and Donnell's mother
Dennis Scott as Coach Hancock

Cool Dr. Money & The Money Girls 
  Tony Delana as Cool Dr. Money
 Lee Hastings 
 Ana Palmas 
 Sunny Raskin 
 Katrina Webster

Celebrity cameos 
In the tenth episode of the series, former Charlotte Hornets basketball player Kendall Gill made a guest appearance. (Gill was a member of the Seattle SuperSonics at the time.)

The show also featured former Orlando Magic small forward Dennis Scott as a coach, in the episode "Hit the Open Man".

It would also feature Kenny Layne, the kid who had his hair cut similar to Cool Doctor Money in episode thirteen (Dee-Dee's Haircut). Layne is a professional wrestler formerly signed to TNA Wrestling, where he is a two-time X Division Champion, and currently signed to Ring of Honor. He uses the ring name of "Kenny King".

Episodes

Cancellation
The show made history as the network's first show featuring a predominantly black cast. Despite its popularity during its premiere, the series only lasted 13 episodes. Ralph Woolfolk IV explained in an interview that the show was canceled due to disagreements between the producers and creators of the show; a second season was planned but the two parties had different visions for the show that caused a major fallout. 
In addition, two episodes (Christmas special and a Family Reunion) were filmed but for reasons unknown, never aired.

Home media
"My Brother and Me: The Complete Series" was released on June 23, 2014, exclusively on Amazon.com. This release contains two discs. It is published on demand onto DVD-Rs. All My Brother and Me episodes can be found on iTunes.

Awards and nominations 
In 1996 and 1997, My Brother and Me was nominated for the NAACP Image Award (Outstanding Youth or Children's Series/Special).

References

External links 
 
 Retro Junk – My Brother and Me

1990s American teen sitcoms
1990s American black sitcoms
1994 American television series debuts
1995 American television series endings
English-language television shows
Fictional duos
Television shows set in North Carolina
Television series about brothers
Television series about children
Television series about families